Badreh Gerd-e Salimi (also Romanized as Badreh Gerd-e Salīmī; also known as Badregerd-e Salīmī and Badreh Gerd) is a village in Homeyl Rural District, Homeyl District, Eslamabad-e Gharb County, Kermanshah Province, Iran. At the 2006 census, its population was 60, in 15 families.

References 

Populated places in Eslamabad-e Gharb County